Boltino is a rural locality (a village) in Spasskoye Rural Settlement, Vologodsky District, Vologda Oblast, Russia. The population was 11 as of 2002. There are 6 streets.

Geography 
Boltino is located 8 km south of Vologda (the district's administrative centre) by road. Kiriki-Ulita is the nearest rural locality.

References 

Rural localities in Vologodsky District